Crljeni  is a village in the municipality of Ključ, Bosnia and Herzegovina.

Demographics 
According to the 2013 census, its population was 307, all Bosniaks.

References

Populated places in Ključ